Bretz is an unincorporated community in Preston County, West Virginia, United States.

The community most likely has the name of a local family.

References 

Unincorporated communities in West Virginia
Unincorporated communities in Preston County, West Virginia